The following is a list of episodes from the FX series Rescue Me. Broadcast from 2004 to 2011, the series aired 93 episodes over seven seasons, plus 11 additional mini-episodes.

Series overview 
{| class="wikitable" style="text-align: center;"
|-
! colspan="2" rowspan="2"|Season
! rowspan="2"|Episodes
! colspan="2"|Originally aired
|-
!First aired
!Last aired
|-
|bgcolor="#0000FF"|
|1
|13
|
|
|-
|bgcolor="#A90000"|
|2
|13
|
|
|-
|bgcolor="#00FF00"|
|3
|13
|
|
|-
|bgcolor="#FF7F00"|
|4
|13
|
|
|-
|bgcolor="#CCCCCC"|
|Minisodes
|10
|
|
|-
|bgcolor="#7B3D00"|
|5
|22
|
|
|-
|bgcolor="#006400"|
|6
|10
|
|
|-
|bgcolor="#000080"|
|7
|9
|
|
|-
|}

Episodes

Season 1 (2004)

Season 2 (2005)

A 15-minute episode was produced between the second and third seasons, and released to several websites and cable providers as a promotion for season three. It was released on the third season DVD set as an extra. It is commonly listed under various names online, including "Rescue Me 2.5", "Special Presentation", "Courageous Men" and "Comedy Short".

Season 3 (2006)

Season 4 (2007)

Minisodes (2008)
A series of 10 five-minute shorts were released in 2008 to bridge the gap between seasons 4 and 5. In addition to airing on FX, the shorts were made available on various video websites, including Hulu and Crackle.

Season 5 (2009)

Season 6 (2010)

Season 7 (2011)

References

Lists of American comedy-drama television series episodes